Kasthuri News 24 is a Kannada News Channel (21 November 2011). It is the sixth Kannada news channel. It was launched by Anitha Kumaraswamy. The channel is a free to air channel.

The channel is available for viewing via cable and satellite.

See also
List of Kannada-language television channels
Television in India
Media in Karnataka
Media of India

References 

Kannada-language television channels
Television stations in Bangalore
Television channels and stations established in 2011
24-hour television news channels in India
2011 establishments in Karnataka